Thomas Hayes (born 7 March 1997) is a Norwegian-British actor and DJ. He is best known for his role as William Magnusson in the Norwegian teen drama web series Skam.

Filmography

Film 
 Fuck Fossils (2017)

TV 
 SKAM (2015–2017)
 Elven / The River (2017)
 His Name Is Not William (2018)

Music 
Hayes appeared in the music video "Ignite", released by K-391 & Alan Walker (feat. Julie Bergan & Seungri) on 12 May 2018.

He also appeared in the music video for "Electro House 2019", released by EJP.

Hayes recently released a song with Nico & Vinz called "Where I Belong", under his DJ/musician alias HAYES.

References 

1997 births
Living people
People from Asker
Norwegian male television actors
21st-century Norwegian male actors